The Communauté de communes de Mirecourt Dompaire is an administrative association of rural communes in the Vosges department of eastern France. It was created on 1 January 2017 by the merger of the former Communauté de communes du Pays de Mirecourt (which had absorbed the former Communauté de communes du Xaintois in January 2014), Communauté de communes du Secteur de Dompaire and 16 other communes. On 1 January 2018 it lost 2 communes to the Communauté d'agglomération d'Épinal. It consists of 76 communes, and has its administrative offices at Mirecourt. Its area is 473.7 km2, and its population was 18,863 in 2019.

Composition
The communauté de communes consists of the following 76 communes:

Les Ableuvenettes
Ahéville
Ambacourt
Avillers
Avrainville
Bainville-aux-Saules
Battexey
Baudricourt
Bazegney
Begnécourt
Bettegney-Saint-Brice
Bettoncourt
Biécourt
Blémerey
Bocquegney
Boulaincourt
Bouxières-aux-Bois
Bouxurulles
Bouzemont
Chauffecourt
Chef-Haut
Circourt
Damas-et-Bettegney
Derbamont
Dombasle-en-Xaintois
Dommartin-aux-Bois
Dompaire
Domvallier
Évaux-et-Ménil
Frenelle-la-Grande
Frenelle-la-Petite
Gelvécourt-et-Adompt
Gircourt-lès-Viéville
Gorhey
Gugney-aux-Aulx
Hagécourt
Harol
Hennecourt
Hymont
Jorxey
Juvaincourt
Légéville-et-Bonfays
Madecourt
Madegney
Madonne-et-Lamerey
Marainville-sur-Madon
Maroncourt
Mattaincourt
Mazirot
Mirecourt
Oëlleville
Pierrefitte
Pont-sur-Madon
Poussay
Puzieux
Racécourt
Ramecourt
Rancourt
Rapey
Regney
Remicourt
Repel
Rouvres-en-Xaintois
Saint-Prancher
Saint-Vallier
Thiraucourt
Totainville
Valleroy-aux-Saules
Varmonzey
Vaubexy
Velotte-et-Tatignécourt
Villers
Ville-sur-Illon
Vomécourt-sur-Madon
Vroville
Xaronval

References

Mirecourt Dompaire
Mirecourt Dompaire